"Go to Sea Once More" is a sea shanty about a sailor who, once ashore, gets very drunk and loses all his clothing and hard-earned money when a prostitute steals them. Though he has sworn to never work at sea again, this situation forces him to accept a position on a whaling ship bound for the Arctic Sea, having to endure terrible conditions such as the freezing cold. The sailor's name varies slightly in the different versions of the song, though typically he is named Jack Tarr, Jack Sprat, or Jack Wrack. The song urges sailors to avoid strong drink and the hard lifestyle that comes with it, and to "get married instead". The exact origins of the song can be traced to the English Merchant Navy, likely from the 1700 - 1900 period.

As with most traditional folk songs, different versions developed over the years. The Wolfe Tones released a version in 1970 under the title of "The Holy Ground" with modified melody and lyrics, which holds true to the themes of the original song. Irish artists such as Ryan's Fancy and The Dubliners recorded very faithful versions with the slightly modified title "Go to Sea No More", while other versions, such as the one recorded in the late 1960s by the American folk-rock band The Byrds on their Ballad of Easy Rider album, use the title "Jack Tarr the Sailor" while telling the same tale. A bluegrass version by Jerry Garcia and David Grisman was released in 1996 on their album Shady Grove under the title "Off to Sea Once More".  More recently The Longest Johns released a cover under the title Off To Sea on their album Between Wind and Water in 2018.

References

External links 
 Go to Sea Once More The lyrics 
 Off to sea once more slightly different lyrics
 Go to Sea Once MoreThe song as it sounds 

Sea shanties
Year of song unknown
Songwriter unknown